

The Renard R.30 was a prototype trimotor airliner built in Belgium in 1931. It was a strut-braced high-wing monoplane of conventional design with a fully enclosed flight deck and separate passenger compartment. One engine was mounted on the nose, while the other two were mounted on the leading edges of the wings. Construction was metal throughout, skinned in plywood and fabric.

The R.30 was designed in response to a Belgian government requirement of 1929 for a long-range passenger transport aircraft to service Belgian Congo. The design met the specifications laid down, but by the time it flew in 1931, it was judged already obsolete. The single prototype, registered OO-AMK, was the only example built.

Specifications

References

Further reading
 

1930s Belgian airliners
R.30
Trimotors
High-wing aircraft
Aircraft first flown in 1931